Paper pallets, or ecopallets, are shipping or display pallets made from paperboard.

Construction
Paper shipping pallets come in corrugated fiberboard, partial wood decks or engineered with laminated paperboard. Some are made of paperboard composite honeycomb. Several designs have been developed.

See also
 Unit load

References

 Fiedler, R. M, "Distribution Packaging Technology", IoPP, 1995
 McKinlay, A. H., "Transport Packaging",IoPP, 2004 
 Soroka, W, "Fundamentals of Packaging Technology", IoPP, 2002, 
 Yam, K. L., "Encyclopedia of Packaging Technology", John Wiley & Sons, 2009, 

Pallets